Meyer Habib (born 28 April 1961) is a Tunisian-Jewish French-Israeli politician of the Union of Democrats and Independents (UDI) who has been serving as a member of the French National Assembly from 2013 to 2023, representing the eighth constituency for French residents overseas.

Political career
In parliament, Habib has been serving on the Committee on Foreign Affairs since 2013.

In the Republicans' 2016 presidential primary, Habib endorsed François Fillon as the party's candidate for the 2017 French presidential election.

In July 2016, documents from the office of Israeli Prime Minister Benjamin Netanyahu revealed that Meyer Habib financed several trips abroad by Netanyahu in the 2000s. Shortly after his re-election in 2017, he criticized the French media for bashing his long-standing friendship with Netanyahu.

References

1961 births
Living people
Deputies of the 14th National Assembly of the French Fifth Republic
Deputies of the 15th National Assembly of the French Fifth Republic
Union of Democrats and Independents politicians
Jewish French politicians
Israeli people of Tunisian-Jewish descent
Likud politicians
Politicians from Paris
Technion – Israel Institute of Technology alumni
Members of Parliament for French people living outside France
Deputies of the 16th National Assembly of the French Fifth Republic